Sorbus fruticosa is a species of Rowan. It has been cultivated and grown in gardens as an ornamental plant. It grows large clusters of white berries, which are actually small pome fruits. The small shrub produces fruit every summer and attracts many birds.

External links
 Sorbus fruticosa info

fruticosa